The reconstruction of New Orleans refers to the rebuilding process endured by the city of New Orleans after Hurricane Katrina destroyed much of the city on August 29, 2005. The storm caused levees to fail, releasing tens of billions of gallons of water. The levee failure contributed to extensive flooding in the New Orleans area and surrounding parishes. About 80% of all structures in Orleans Parish sustained water damage. Over 204,000 homes were damaged or destroyed, and more than 800,000 citizens displaced—the greatest displacement in the United States since the Dust Bowl of the 1930s. Wind damage was less severe than predicted. The damage that took place that needed to be repaired cost about $125 billion.

Reconstruction was hindered by bureaucratic problems and funding issues with the U.S. Army Corps of Engineers and the Federal Emergency Management Agency (FEMA). Relief agencies provided supplemental relief. By mid-June 2006, the city was again hosting conventions and promoting tourism.

Reconstruction
Residents were authorized to return to examine homes after the storm on Monday, September 5, 2005. In downtown New Orleans, several places were indeed producing power. Due to contaminated water and uninhabitable conditions, the Mayor ordered that all citizens be evacuated by September 6.

Levee and pump repairs
The Corps of Engineers repaired the 55 levee breaches including the Industrial Canal, 17th Street Canal, and London Avenue Canal since shortly after the storm, and continues to work on mitigating the risk posed by flooding.

Utilities
Testing found the flood waters were not unusual. The Louisiana Department of Environmental Quality and the U.S. Environmental Protection Agency (EPA) in March 2006 declared all parts of New Orleans safe; no soil was contaminated and the air quality was pure.

Water and sewage services were gradually restored. The first section of the city to have a "boil water" order lifted was in the high ground of the old crescent along the River from the French Quarter to old Carrollton on October 6, 2005. The last section of the city to have such an order lifted (a section of the Lower 9th Ward) was on October 9, 2006.

Federal funding debate

Some people, including Speaker of the House Dennis Hastert, questioned whether federal funds should pay to rebuild New Orleans. Others consider New Orleans's unique cultural heritage and history to be as important to the United States as, for instance, Venice is to Italy; they maintain that to not rebuild and reoccupy the city would be an immeasurable loss in that regard. The Times-Picayune ran a front-page editorial arguing for national help. It has been argued that since the US Army Corps of Engineers has had oversight over the levee system since the Great Mississippi Flood of 1927 and most of the destruction in the city occurred due to the levee failure, the federal government should be responsible for rebuilding. Senator Mary Landrieu said that Louisiana's offshore petroleum leases generate billions of dollars in revenues for the federal government's general fund, more than would be needed to restore wetlands and upgrade levee/flood control for South Louisiana to withstand category 5 storms. She argued that the federal government should either earmark some of that income for such projects or allow Louisiana to keep a significant portion of that revenue so the state could take care of its needs itself.

Rebuilding, social justice, and community life 
Frederic Schwartz, the architect selected by the citizens of New Orleans and the New Orleans City Planning Commission to replan one-third of the city for 40% of its population explained how the opportunity for rebuilding the city could be a chance to strengthen social justice and community life:

The planning of cities in the face of disaster (natural and political) must reach beyond the band-aid of short-term recovery.  Disaster offers a unique opportunity to rethink the planning and politics of our metro-regional areas – it is a chance to redefine our cities and to reassert values of environmental care and social justice, of community building and especially of helping the poor with programs for quality, affordable, and sustainable housing.

As lead planners for District 4, the district that includes the "largest concentration of public housing in the city" (Iberville, St. Bernard, Lafitte, and B. W. Cooper), Schwartz challenged his team to make "every effort to involve the residents and the community in the planning effort," while ensuring that the design of the new housing "could maintain the look and feel of surrounding neighborhoods with a mix of both modern interpretation of historic typologies and new urbanist models."

Relief agencies

Relief agencies helped many returnees. The American Red Cross made a belated but nonetheless significant entry into the city in mid-September; and by the start of October had a number of relief centers set up around the city.  These provided hot meals, packaged food, bottled water and other supplies like diapers, mops, and dust masks. The Salvation Army also had many stations giving food. Temporary free clinics provided some medical care. Towards the end of 2005, the relief centers were wound down, starting with those in functioning parts of the city. Red Cross meals continued at a much smaller scale into 2006 from trucks traveling around the worst-hit and poorest neighborhoods.

The Southern Baptist Convention sent feeding units to New Orleans and the Mississippi Gulf Coast the day after Katrina struck New Orleans. Since this time, the Southern Baptist Convention through its North American Mission Board established an ongoing project called Operation Noah Rebuild, (not to be confused with the Operation Noah sponsored by the City of New Orleans) which has hosted thousands of volunteers and teams from all over the United States. The volunteer teams helped in the reconstruction efforts in New Orleans and the surrounding parishes. First Baptist Church of New Orleans worked hand-in-hand with Habitat for Humanity with the Baptist Crossroads Project, in an effort to rebuild homes in the Upper Ninth Ward.

Food Not Bombs was active in providing food early after the disaster. A community kitchen was set up first in Washington Square in Faubourg Marigny; after a few months it was moved to a park by Bayou St. John before being closed down. A number of church groups and smaller charities set up aid for a time.

Common Ground Collective had two relief centers in the Ninth Ward of New Orleans, providing food, clothing, and a tool library. The larger center was in the Upper 9th Ward, with a smaller one in the worst hit part of the Lower 9th Ward. They also helped gutting houses.

The Church of Jesus Christ of Latter-day Saints began bringing in load after load of food and water for local members and residents to several areas of the city. Thousands of church members came in on rotating weekends to help clean up debris, gut houses and cut up fallen trees all over the city. In addition to the home repairs, the church full-time counselors were available to provide mental health assistance; and church employment centers—offices that aid with finding jobs—opened their doors to everyone, regardless of religion.

Habitat for Humanity has been active in building homes at an accelerated pace since the storm. Initially, the organization had volunteers gutting homes; but since returned to its primary mission of fighting poverty housing. Catholic Charities also was very active with volunteers repairing damaged houses and churches throughout the area. Camp Hope in Violet, LA housed volunteers in the Hurricane Katrina recovery effort of St. Bernard Parish since June 1, 2006.

Build Now is a non-profit organization that played an active part in bringing New Orleans families back home. The non-profit, a licensed and insured residential contractor, constructed site-built, elevated houses on hurricane-damaged lots. The homes reflect the style and quality of traditional New Orleans architecture. Build Now brought more than a dozen New Orleans families back home, including construction around the Lakeview, Gentilly and the Upper and Lower Ninth Ward areas. The organization moved New Orleans families back home since beginning operations in 2008.

The Jazz Foundation of America is a non-profit organization that helped New Orleans musicians directly by paying the first month's rent for new homes, getting nearly $250,000 worth of donated instruments to musicians, giving pro bono counseling, advocacy, legal counseling, and creating a long term employment program that put displaced musicians back to work performing free concerts in schools and nursing homes, in eight states. In 2005 The foundation held an auction to benefit musicians affected by Hurricane Katrina  Thanks to the generosity of the foundation's chairwoman, Ms. Agnes Varis, they were able to create employment programs which have made it possible to keep the artists and their music alive in New Orleans.

Repopulation and restoring homes 

Repopulating the city has been steady but gradual, with neither the rapid return of most evacuees hoped for by some optimists nor the long term "ghost town" desertion of the city feared by some pessimists. In early 2006, the RAND Corporation estimated that, even in 2008, the city's population would only be little more than half what it was before the storm hit; however by July 2007 the city's population was estimated at about two-thirds (or close to 300,000 residents) of that before the disaster.

Even in 2009, many homes and homeowners were still devastated. Some organizations, like the statewide Louisiana Disaster Relief Foundation or the neighborhood-based United Saints Recovery Project, are still working to provide support to homeowners in rebuilding their homes.

The areas with little or no flooding were the first to be officially reopened, have utilities restored, and a sizable portion of residents and businesses return.

Flooded-out areas presented more problems. The city had no comprehensive plan for what to do about flooded areas. Thousands of property owners have been gutting and repairing their property, some in the lowest lying areas of town. Contractors and workers from out-of-state and other countries came in great numbers doing demolition and reconstruction work, some filling hotels and rental property, others living in trailers and tent cities set up in city parks and parking lots. Sportscaster Mike Tirico incorrectly generalized on Monday Night Football in September 2006, some areas, like the Lower Ninth Ward and Gentilly, still looked as badly damaged as the day the storm passed through. However, in each of those neighborhoods thousands of truckloads of debris were removed, hundreds of unsalvageable houses demolished, and work on gutting and repairs has been constant since the city has reopened.

Hundreds, if not thousands, of New Orleanians lived in the largely intact upper stories of their homes while the flood damaged downstairs got repaired, often being stripped to the wall studs in the process.

The U.S. Army Corps of Engineers set up the "Blue Roof Program" of putting blue tarps over damaged roofs. The tarps kept out rain until more permanent roof repairs could be made. Thousands of blue tarps were seen throughout the city; however, a number of official restrictions meant some residents were unable to benefit from this recovery program. Likewise, a number of subcontractors paid by the Corps only did "easy" low-pitch one-story roofs, choosing not to return to do more difficult roofs. Some New Orleanians lived for months in homes with sizable holes in their roofs. Among the popular handouts at Red Cross relief stations were 5-gallon buckets, many put to use as rain catchers. Six months after the storm, many of the hastily placed blue roof tarps were in tatters, leaving those homes vulnerable again. Many people did not succeed in getting permanent roof repairs from such reasons as long waiting lists for reliable contractors and waits for insurance payment.

Seven months after the storm, two-thirds of the requested FEMA trailers (designed for short term emergency housing immediately after a disaster) had been delivered. Many of these trailers, however, could not be occupied or, if occupied, were not properly functional. Delays of weeks or months in hooking up electricity and water to trailers were common, and mechanical and bureaucratic problems prevented use of the trailers.

In June 2006, the State of Louisiana finally awarded a contract to DRC, Inc. of Mobile, Alabama to remove thousands of abandoned cars strewn throughout New Orleans after Hurricane Katrina.

Differing circumstances
Reconstruction has been easiest and quickest in the areas least damaged by the storm, mostly corresponding to the parts of the city developed before about 1900. These areas were built on naturally higher ground along the River front (such as Old Carrollton, Uptown, the Old Warehouse District, the French Quarter, Old Marigny, and Bywater), along with areas along natural ridges (such as Esplanade Ridge, Bayou St. John, Gentilly Ridge). Most of these older areas had no flooding at all or escaped serious flooding because of the raised design of older architecture which prevented floodwaters from entering homes. Another high area, much of which escaped serious flooding, was the set of Lake Shore developments between Lake Pontchartrain and Robert E. Lee Boulevard, built at a higher level than nearby land from mid-20th century dredging.

Due to the direction of the storm and the movement of storm surge, the West Bank section of the city, Algiers was spared flooding and became the first part of the city itself to officially reopen to residents.

In neighboring Jefferson Parish, the West Bank communities were similarly spared all but some wind damage (with a few spots of minor rain-generated flooding). On the East Bank, while parts of Metairie and other Jefferson communities experienced some flooding, due to lack of levee breaches this was much less severe than across the Parish line in Orleans (or the devastation of the 1947 Fort Lauderdale Hurricane which flooded most of Jefferson's East Bank).

Reconstruction of each section of the area has been addressed in the Army Corps LACPR Final Technical Report which identifies areas to not be rebuilt and areas buildings need to be elevated. The Technical Report includes locations of possible new levees; suggested existing levee modifications; "Inundation Zones"; "Water depths less than 14 feet, Raise-In-Place of Structures"; "Water depths greater than 14 feet, Buyout of Structures"; "Velocity Zones"; and "Buyout of Structures" areas for five different scenarios. The Corps of Engineers will submit the report to Congress for consideration, planning, and response in mid-2009.

A larger percentage of white residents returned to their homes than did black residents. This was attributed to an unwillingness of planners to rebuild low-income housing. In September 2005, the Washington Post noted former 10-term Republican Congressman Richard H. Baker from Baton Rouge reportedly told lobbyists, "We finally cleaned up public housing in New Orleans. We couldn't do it, but God did", and criticized his lack of concern for the lower income residents.

FEMA caseworkers were charged with the responsibility of helping evacuees find housing and employment.  Caseworkers had to help some former residents realize that moving back was unrealistic because some of the city was not being rebuilt.  This created a diaspora as many evacuees wished to return to New Orleans but were not able to.

Large areas of the city's public housing were targeted for demolition, inciting vocal protests from some, including architecture critic Nicolai Ouroussoff.

Homeless residents

A challenge facing New Orleans was the exceptionally large homeless population created by Katrina. The number of homeless people living in New Orleans doubled to 12,000 people between the hurricane and mid-2007. With a post-Katrina population of 300,000 people, this meant that 1 in 25 people were homeless, an extremely high number and nearly three times that of any other US city. Most of the homeless were Katrina evacuees who returned to higher rents or who fell through the cracks of the federal system that was to provide temporary housing after the disaster. There were also some workers who came from out of state for the post-Katrina rebuilding boom but who subsequently lost their jobs.  Compounding this problem, the number of beds for the homeless in the city decreased from a count of 2,800 before the storm to 2,000 as of May 2008.

The New Orleans Legal Assistance Corporation's Homeless Department worked overtime in January 2009 and reevaluated the homelessness rate. They found that the post-Katrina homeless population decreased by 64% since the last survey two years prior.

UNITY of Greater New Orleans reported 1,188 homeless people after their 2018 Point-in-Time count performed in January. As of 2018, New Orleans has maintained a "functional zero" in veteran homelessness for three years. Going forward, UNITY's efforts are focused on support for chronically homeless people with physical and/or mental disabilities.

Neighborhood and community-based organizations 
Neighborhood and community-based organizations played a significant role in the reconstruction effort after Katrina. Neighborhood associations and resident-leaders from communities across the city established an information-sharing network called the Neighborhoods Partnership Network (NPN) where they shared lessons learned through the rebuilding process with each other as well as information about important upcoming citywide or neighborhood planning meetings, resources (on volunteers, tools, programs and application processes, etc.), and calls and offers for help and collaboration. Network members shared information and resources identified through the network with their own communities and neighbors. Early on, members also used NPN as a way to identify and collectively point out issues and collective priorities to local government officials and agencies and propose possible solutions. The network eventually established a newspaper, The Trumpet, that was circulated locally to disseminate information, highlight and celebrate progress, and to facilitate connections for collaboration.

Businesses
Bars were the first businesses to reopen in many areas; two remained open in the French Quarter even during the worst of the storm and the official mandatory evacuation. Most other businesses, such as gas stations, appliance stores, and supermarkets, followed somewhat later as they required more work before they could reopen. Three months after the storm, most open restaurants were serving food and drink in disposable plates and cups because of the shortage of dishwashers. Despite many restaurants offering wages double pre-Katrina levels for dishwashers, there were few takers as untrained laborers were able to make more money in demolition- and reconstruction-related industries. Ten months later, things had improved, though there were still labor shortages in many service industries.

Some of the few businesses to do significantly better business after Katrina than before were new car dealers. Flooding totaled an estimated 200,000 vehicles in Metro New Orleans, and dealers able to get in shipments of new cars quickly found customers. After local reporters found a used car dealer selling partially cleaned up flooded cars with restored engines but still soggy trunks, the state legislature quickly passed legislation mandating that cars declared totaled must be dismantled, crushed, or otherwise disposed of and could not be resold.

Lieutenant Governor Mitch Landrieu (who later became Mayor of New Orleans) declared that Louisiana housed America's soul, and its revival was of paramount importance. As New Orleans began reviving its local businesses, the reestablishment of the city's restaurants, particularly mom and pop eateries, received fervent local and national support. New Orleans's cuisine has largely maintained its cultural distinctiveness, linking its citizens with the city's creole roots. Long before Hurricane Katrina, 'local' food in New Orleans represented a framework for discussing America's racial binary—a paradigm in which the city has generally attempted to resist. Thus, even if race prevented a portion of New Orleanians from "[acknowledging] that they do, indeed, share one culture",  culture became recognized as "something shared around which the city's residents could rally" during an arduous rebuild. By emphasizing the restoration of not only New Orleans's economic but also its cultural capital, the city yielded the additional benefit of a reinvigorated social capital.

Tourism and events
The American Library Association held its annual convention in New Orleans in June 2006; the estimated 18,000 attendees represented the first citywide convention in New Orleans since Hurricane Katrina. The National Association of Realtors also held their annual convention in New Orleans bringing 30,000 attendees to the city in November 2006. The HIMSS healthcare information technology convention and the American College of Cardiology convention, both held in the spring of 2007, each had more than 24,000 attendees. The Essence Music Festival returned to the Crescent City in July 2007 after being displaced to Houston in 2006.  Several national travel guides have once again listed New Orleans as one of the top five places to visit in the country.

The Bayou Classic, the traditional football game between Southern University and Grambling State University, returned in November 2006 after being displaced to Houston for its 2005 game. The National Football League made a commitment to the city with the return of the New Orleans Saints, following speculation about a move to San Antonio or Los Angeles. The National Basketball Association has made a commitment with the return of the New Orleans Hornets (now the Pelicans), which played in both New Orleans and Oklahoma City, in the 2005–2006 and 2006–2007 seasons, returning fully for the 2007–2008 season. (Oklahoma City became a permanent member of the NBA in the 2007–2008 season.) New Orleans was granted the 2008 NBA All Star Game, which usually generates millions of dollars in revenue for the host city. Tulane University hosted the first and second rounds of the 2007 NCAA Men's Division I Basketball Championship. The Hornets were renamed to the Pelicans before the 2013–2014 season, and the former name was reclaimed by the then–Charlotte Bobcats the next season.

The Superdome has since hosted several college football bowl games, and a Super Bowl. The New Orleans Bowl resumed in December 2006, and the Sugar Bowl and 2008 BCS National Championship Game took in January 2008. New Orleans hosted the Super Bowl in 2013 for the first time since Hurricane Katrina. In February 2010, the New Orleans Saints won Super Bowl XLIV.

In mid-March 2007, a local group of investors began conducting a study to see if the city could support a Major League Soccer team.

Major seasonal events, such as New Orleans Mardi Gras and the Jazz and Heritage Festival, were never displaced, occurring at other times of year.

Long-term redevelopment

The Greater New Orleans Urban Water Plan 
The Greater New Orleans Urban Water Plan (UWP) is a collaborative, multibillion dollar post-Katrina redevelopment plan for the New Orleans metropolitan area. Originally released in 2013, the UWP is the result of collaborative efforts among Greater New Orleans, Inc., local civic leaders, and stormwater management experts. Waggonner & Ball Architects, a private firm based in New Orleans, coordinated the project with the support of Greater New Orleans, Inc. The project sought to rethink New Orleans's stormwater management and drainage infrastructure to ensure the city's longevity amidst subsidence and climate change concerns. Additionally, a major component of the project was the revitalization and economic development of areas within the city that had been severely impacted by the hurricane. In November 2013, Waggonner & Ball produced the UWP in three parts: Vision, Urban Design, and Implementation.

Waggonner & Ball coined the term "living with water" to describe the UWP's emphasis on storing and holding water within the city limits rather than pumping water out into major waterways, such as the Mississippi River and Lake Pontchartrain. The project views water as an asset and draws upon the Dutch model for flood control in the Netherlands. The plan relies on green infrastructure practices, such as bioswales, greenways, blueways, rain gardens, and permeable pavement, to capture and store excess stormwater. The project is divided among the Jefferson–Orleans basin, the Orleans East Basin, and the St. Bernard Basin, and is a coordinated effort among Jefferson, Orleans, and St. Bernard Parishes. Waggonner & Ball estimates that fully implementing the UWP would cost $6.2 billion with long-term projected benefits of $22 billion, whereas maintaining the pre-Katrina infrastructure model would cost New Orleans more than $10 billion over the next few decades.

The project has served as a primary guide for the New Orleans City Council's Capital Improvement Plan since the adoption of the 2020–2024 Capital Improvement Plan in September 2019 under Mayor LaToya Cantrell.

See also
Bring New Orleans Back Commission
Civil engineering and infrastructure repair in New Orleans after Hurricane Katrina
Musicians' Village
Lake Borgne Surge Barrier
Seabrook Floodgate
Gulf Coast Civic Works Act

References

External links

 Neighborhoods Partnership Network resident-and-neighborhood based information-sharing network that formed after Hurricane Katrina
 Greater New Orleans Data Center (GNODC) site for data pre-Katrina; post-Katrina, it expanded its scope through a new site The Data Center
 Stress and Trauma Relief Workshops in New Orleans offered for free and at reduced costs by the International Association for Human Values
 United Saints Recovery Project is a volunteer organization that provides rebuilding and recovery for homeowners in New Orleans, mainly in the Central City neighborhood
 Common Ground Collective
 Providence Community Housing, a leading non-profit housing development group
 NYT: Storm and Crisis
 Dennis Hastert's comments
 Times Picayune editorial
 Independent Levee Investigation Team Draft Report
 Repopulating New Orleans
 Habitat For Humanity – New Orleans
 Camp Hope
 Professor lauded for New Orleans recovery work
 New Orleans Neighborhoods Rebuilding Plan
 Project: Katrina Volunteers
 We Are New Orleans (1 Letter)
 For the Right of Return article about destruction of public housing in New Orleans from [Dollars & Sense] magazine, January/February 2008
Dorothy Moye, "The X-Codes: A Post-Katrina Postscript", Southern Spaces, 26 August 2009. http://southernspaces.org/2009/x-codes-post-katrina-postscript

Corruption accusations
 Study: U.S. double-billed for Katrina work, AP, May 4, 2006
 Fed Inspectors: Katrina Contracts Wasteful, AP, April 20, 2006
Multiple Layers Of Contractors Drive Up Cost of Katrina Cleanup, Washington Post, March 20, 2006
 Lobbyists Advise Katrina Relief, LA Times, October 10, 2005
 No-Bid Contracts Win Katrina Work, Wall Street Journal, September 12, 2005
 Destruction of Public Housing, December 3, 2007

Hurricane Katrina recovery in New Orleans